HMS Hever Castle was a  constructed for the British Royal Navy in the Second World War. Transferred to the Royal Canadian Navy before completion, the ship was renamed HMCS Copper Cliff and saw service as a convoy escort for the remainder of the war. Following the war, the vessel was sold for mercantile use and renamed Ta Lung, operating under a Chinese flag. In 1949, the ship was taken over by the Communist Chinese government, rearmed and renamed Wan Lee.

Design and description
The Castle class were an improved corvette design over their predecessor . The Flower class was not considered acceptable for mid-Atlantic sailing and was only used on Atlantic convoy duty out of need. Though the Admiralty would have preferred s, the inability of many small shipyards to construct the larger ships required them to come up with a smaller vessel. The increased length of the Castle class over their predecessors and their improved hull form gave the Castles better speed and performance on patrol in the North Atlantic and an acceptable replacement for the Flowers. This, coupled with improved anti-submarine armament in the form of the Squid mortar led to a much more capable anti-submarine warfare (ASW) vessel. However, the design did have criticisms, mainly in the way it handled at low speeds and that the class's maximum speed was already slower than the speeds of the new U-boats they would be facing.

The ships had a complement of 120.

The ships were powered by two Admiralty three-drum boilers which created .

The corvettes were armed with one QF 4-inch Mk XIX gun mounted forward. Anti-air armament varied from 4 to 10 Oerlikon 20 mm cannons. For ASW purposes, the ships were equipped with one three-barreled Squid anti-submarine mortar with 81 projectiles. The ships also had two depth charge throwers and one depth charge rail on the stern that came with 15 depth charges.

The ships were equipped with Type 145 and Type 147B ASDIC. The Type 147B was tied to the Squid anti-submarine mortar and would automatically set the depth on the fuses of the projectiles until the moment of firing. A single Squid-launched attack had a success rate of 25%. The class was also provided with HF/DF and Type 277 radar.

Construction and career

Hever Castle was ordered on 23 January 1943. The ship, named for Hever Castle in Hever, Kent, was laid down on 29 June 1943 and launched on 24 February 1944. At some point in 1943, the ship was transferred to the Royal Canadian Navy. The corvette, renamed Copper Cliff after a suburb of Sudbury, Ontario, was commissioned into the Royal Canadian Navy on 25 February 1944 with the pennant number K495.

After working up at Tobermory, Copper Cliff was assigned to the Mid-Ocean Escort Force as part of the escort group C-6 as a convoy escort in August 1944. During a boiler cleaning in September, she was used to test the Type 277 radar. In October, Copper Cliff switched to group C-7 and remained on escort duty for the remainder of the war. In June 1945, Copper Cliff returned to Canada, stopping in Halifax, before continuing on to her final destination of Esquimalt, British Columbia. It was there on 21 November 1945 that Copper Cliff was paid off and placed in reserve.

In 1946, Copper Cliff was sold for mercantile use under a Chinese flag and renamed Ta Lung. Converted to a cargo ship, the vessel had a gross register tonnage of 1,305 tons. The ship was renamed Wan Lee in 1947 and was taken over by the Communist Chinese government in 1949. The ship remained listed until 1968, however, following that the ship's existence remained doubtful even though it was reported on until 1977–78.

References

Notes

Citations

References

 
 
 
 

 
 
 

 

Ships of the Royal Canadian Navy
Castle-class corvettes
1944 ships
Ships built on the River Blyth